Andrew Nielsen could refer to:

MC Lars (Andrew Robert Nielsen, born 1982), American rapper and podcaster
Andrew Nielsen (ice hockey) (born 1996), Canadian ice hockey defenceman